was a Japanese poet. He was the first son of Fujiwara no Kanesuke, among the Thirty-six Poetry Immortals and the grandfather of Murasaki Shikibu. Kiyotada was his younger brother. He married a daughter of Fujiwara no Sadakata; their children include Tametoki, the father of Murasaki. He was also acquainted with Ki no Tsurayuki.

External links
 the profile and e-text of his poems in Japanese.

Fujiwara clan
961 deaths
Year of birth unknown
10th-century Japanese poets